Fiona King (née Barclay, born 1 February 1972 ) is a former female rugby union player. She represented  internationally and provincially for Otago and North Harbour. She was a member of the 1998 and 2002 winning squads.

She has spoken at TEDxWellington.

References

1972 births
Living people
New Zealand women's international rugby union players
New Zealand female rugby union players